Otlukbeli District is a district of Erzincan Province in Turkey. The municipality of Otlukbeli is the seat and the district had a population of 2,577 in 2021. It is the least populated district in the province.

The district was established in 1990.

Composition 
Beside the seat of Otlukbeli, the district encompasses ten villages and two hamlets.

References 

Districts of Erzincan Province